Nick Ring (born February 10, 1979) is a Professional boxer and mixed martial artist who is best known for competing in the middleweight division of the Ultimate Fighting Championship. A professional MMA competitor since 2002, Ring fought in various promotions. Ring was a competitor on Spike TV's The Ultimate Fighter 11.

Mixed martial arts career

Early career
Ring's early background in fighting was as a kickboxer, where he compiled around 30 fights. His transition to MMA was quoted as being because "eventually what I liked about MMA versus kickboxing – and I love kickboxing – was just the whole ground aspect. I like the purity of an MMA fight."

Ring was also a professional boxer (during his hiatus from MMA through injury) with a record of 4–1, with 2 victories coming by knockout.

Ring started his MMA career in 2002 in local promotions in his home region of Alberta, Canada against Bill Mahood. Ring was able to win via verbal submission just 22 seconds into the first round.

A year later, Ring made his second professional MMA appearance against Wyatt Lewis. Ring was again victorious, this time via decision after 2 rounds.

Just two weeks later, Ring fought again. Against Alex Gasson, Ring won another decision and followed this up with a submission (strikes) victory over Kevin Dolan.

Two years later, Ring made his return to mixed martial arts against Kimo Woelfel, winning via first round rear naked choke. Ring next fought Mike Malone and won via first round TKO; his first TKO of his career. Ring later won a unanimous decision over Ryuichi Murata.

Injury and return at Bellator
Ring suffered a knee injury which forced him out of competition for over three years. During this time, Ring took up a professional boxing career, compiling a record of 4–1, with three knockouts. He eventually made his return to MMA when he signed with Bellator.

At Bellator 9, Ring fought Isidro Gonzalez and was able to submit him in 39 seconds with a guillotine choke. Ring then won his next two fights against Chester Post and Yannick Galipeau, both in the first round.

It was rumored that Ring was offered a place in Bellator at the same time as The Ultimate Fighter.

The Ultimate Fighter
In March 2010, Ring was announced as part of the eleventh season of The Ultimate Fighter.

In a dominant first performance, to gain entry into the TUF house, Ring defeated Woody Wetherby via TKO due to punches in round 1. Ring earned praise from Tito Ortiz, who expressed his interest in selecting Ring as the first member of Team Punishment. This was indeed to be the case as Ortiz selected him as his number one pick, making Ring the first overall pick of the competition.

For his second bout, Ring fought Court McGee, winning via majority decision (20–18, 19–19, 20–18).

Later on in the competition, McGee was reinstated and the two were set to have a rematch in the quarter-finals. However, after visiting the doctor, Ring discovered that he faced a third ACL reconstruction surgery and faced a choice; fight on injured and risk tearing his meniscus, or withdraw from competition and have surgery immediately. James Hammortree was named as Ring's replacement.

Due to his knee injury and surgery, Ring was not able to compete at the TUF 11 Finale. Ring's surgery took place on April 8, 2010, and afterwards, Ring faced a long period of recovery time, getting cleared to train in September. After his recovery, Ring trained for his debut at UFC 127 at his home club, BDB Martial Arts in Calgary AB, and at Tristar Gym in Montreal QC, with the likes of Georges St-Pierre and Rory MacDonald.

Ultimate Fighting Championship
Ring beat promotional newcomer and DEEP middleweight champion, Riki Fukuda on February 27, 2011, at UFC 127 via controversial unanimous decision. All three judges gave Ring the first two rounds despite Fukuda controlling all three rounds with takedowns.  Literally all major MMA media news organizations scored the fight as a decision win for Fukuda. Regardless of Ring's win on the scorecards, UFC president Dana White, as well as many spectators, felt Fukuda won the bout. Dana stated on his Twitter account that Fukuda would be paid his win bonus.

For his sophomore UFC bout, Ring faced promotional newcomer James Head on June 11, 2011, at UFC 131. He won the fight via submission in the third round.

In his third UFC fight, Ring faced Tim Boetsch on September 24, 2011, at UFC 135.  He lost the fight via unanimous decision, the first loss of his professional MMA career.

Ring then fought Court McGee in a rematch from their time on The Ultimate Fighter on July 21, 2012, at UFC 149. Ring won via unanimous decision. For the second time in a bout against McGee, the win was regarded as controversial by many media sources. Stats after the fight showed that McGee outstruck Ring 32–25 in the second round and 53–16 in the final round. After the fight, McGee said "I felt like I had cage control, was more aggressive, out-struck him and attempted a submission in the third round. I should not have left it in the hands of the judges and finished the fight."

Ring was expected to face Costas Philippou on November 17, 2012, at UFC 154 but the fight was cancelled due to Ring's illness on the day of the weigh ins.

Ring faced Chris Camozzi on March 16, 2013, at UFC 158. He lost the fight via split decision.

Ring was expected to meet Uriah Hall at UFC Fight Night 26. However, Ring was pulled from the bout and initially replaced by Josh Samman, who was ultimately pulled and replaced by UFC returnee John Howard.

Ring faced Caio Magalhães on December 7, 2013, at UFC Fight Night 33. He lost the fight via unanimous decision.

Post UFC career
Nick was released from the UFC. In his first post-UFC bout, he defeated Jason Zentgraf via unanimous decision at Hard Knocks Fighting Championship 43 on May 22, 2015, in Calgary, Alberta.

Personal life
On June 6, 2012, Ring was leaving a Starbucks at Macleod Trail and 94th Avenue in Calgary when he saw a group of about 6–10 people across the street beating up a couple to steal a young woman's backpack. One girl had another girl by her hair and was kneeing her in the face while her boyfriend was trying to protect her but was being held down. Ring got out of his car, checked on the victims, and along with another bystander who saw the fight in progress started to chase what he called the "wannabe gangsters" who ran when they saw them. As he chased the suspects, who appeared to be about 17 or 18 years old, Ring called police on his cellphone and the pair were able to catch one suspect. Ring says police caught another five or six suspects.

Professional boxing record 

{|class="wikitable" style="text-align:center; font-size:95%"
|-
!
!Result
!Record
!Opponent
!Method
!Round, time
!Date
!Location
!Notes
|- 
|6
|Win
|5–1
|align=left| Elvis Vukaj
|UD
|6
|April 3, 2015
|align=left|
|
|- 
|5
|Win
|4–1
|align=left| Willard Lewis
|TKO
|4 (8), 3:00
|April 25, 2009
|align=left|
|
|- 
|4
|Loss
|3–1
|align=left| Kevin Reynolds
|UD
|8
|December 27, 2008
|align=left|
|
|- 
|3
|Win
|3–0
|align=left| Kombo Mohamed
|TKO
|1 (4), 2:24
|March 15, 2008
|align=left|
|
|- 
|2
|Win
|2–0
|align=left| Chris Ladouceur
|MD
|4
|November 22, 2007
|align=left|
|
|- 
|1
|Win
|1–0
|align=left| Paul Tryl
|UD
|4
|September 27, 2007
|align=left|
|

Mixed martial arts record

|-
| Loss
| align=center| 14–4
| Cory Devela
| Decision (unanimous)
| Hard Knocks 44
| 
| align=center| 3
| align=center| 5:00
| Calgary, Alberta, Canada
|
|-
| Win
| align=center| 14–3
| Jason Zentgraf
| Decision (unanimous)
| Hard Knocks 43
| 
| align=center| 3
| align=center| 5:00
| Calgary, Alberta, Canada
|
|-
| Loss
| align=center| 13–3
| Caio Magalhães
| Decision (unanimous)
| UFC Fight Night: Hunt vs. Bigfoot
| 
| align=center| 3
| align=center| 5:00
| Brisbane, Queensland, Australia
| 
|-
| Loss
| align=center| 13–2
| Chris Camozzi
| Decision (split)
| UFC 158
| 
| align=center| 3
| align=center| 5:00
| Montreal, Quebec, Canada
| 
|-
| Win
| align=center| 13–1
| Court McGee
| Decision (unanimous)
| UFC 149
| 
| align=center| 3
| align=center| 5:00
| Calgary, Alberta, Canada
| 
|-
| Loss
| align=center| 12–1
| Tim Boetsch
| Decision (unanimous)
| UFC 135
| 
| align=center| 3
| align=center| 5:00
| Denver, Colorado, United States
| 
|-
| Win
| align=center| 12–0
| James Head
| Submission (rear-naked choke)
| UFC 131
| 
| align=center| 3
| align=center| 3:33
| Vancouver, British Columbia, Canada
| 
|-
| Win
| align=center| 11–0
| Riki Fukuda
| Decision (unanimous)
| UFC 127
| 
| align=center| 3
| align=center| 5:00
| Sydney, Australia
| 
|-
| Win
| align=center| 10–0
| Yannick Galipeau
| Submission (armbar)
| AMMA 1: First Blood
| 
| align=center| 1
| align=center| 2:30
| Edmonton, Alberta, Canada
| 
|-
| Win
| align=center| 9–0
| Chester Post
| TKO (punches)
| Rumble in the Cage 36
| 
| align=center| 1
| align=center| 2:24
| Lethbridge, Alberta, Canada
| 
|-
| Win
| align=center| 8–0
| Isidro Gonzalez
| Submission (guillotine choke)
| Bellator 9
| 
| align=center| 1
| align=center| 0:39
| Monroe, Louisiana, United States
| 
|-
| Win
| align=center| 7–0
| Ryuichi Murata
| Decision (unanimous)
| Deep: 23 Impact
| 
| align=center| 2
| align=center| 5:00
| Tokyo, Japan
| 
|-
| Win
| align=center| 6–0
| Mike Malone
| TKO (punches)
| Icon Sport – Opposites Attract
| 
| align=center| 1
| align=center| 3:04
| Hawaii, United States
| 
|-
| Win
| align=center| 5–0
| Kimo Woelfel
| Submission (rear-naked choke)
| Superbrawl – Icon
| 
| align=center| 1
| align=center| 2:06
| Honolulu, Hawaii, United States
| 
|-
| Win
| align=center| 4–0
| Kevin Dolan
| Submission (punches)
| WFF 4 – Civil War
| 
| align=center| 1
| align=center| 1:20
| Vancouver, British Columbia, Canada
| 
|-
| Win
| align=center| 3–0
| Alex Gasson
| Decision (unanimous)
| Calgary Max
| 
| align=center| 3
| align=center| 5:00
| Calgary, Alberta, Canada
| 
|-
| Win
| align=center| 2–0
| Wyatt Lewis
| Decision (unanimous)
| Roadhouse Rumble 7
| 
| align=center| 2
| align=center| 5:00
| Lethbridge, Alberta, Canada
| 
|-
| Win
| align=center| 1–0
| Bill Mahood
| Submission (verbal)
| Roadhouse Rumble 5
| 
| align=center| 1
| align=center| 0:22
| Lethbridge, Alberta, Canada
|

See also
 List of Bellator MMA alumni
 List of male boxers
 List of mixed martial artists with professional boxing records
 List of Canadian UFC fighters

References

External links
Official UFC Profile

Living people
1979 births
Cruiserweight boxers
Canadian male mixed martial artists
Middleweight mixed martial artists
Mixed martial artists utilizing boxing
Mixed martial artists utilizing Muay Thai
Canadian male kickboxers
Canadian practitioners of Brazilian jiu-jitsu
People awarded a black belt in Brazilian jiu-jitsu
Canadian Muay Thai practitioners
Canadian male boxers
Ultimate Fighting Championship male fighters